HMS D2 was one of eight D-class submarine built for the Royal Navy during the first decade of the 20th century.

Description
The D-class submarines were designed as improved and enlarged versions of the preceding C class, with diesel engines replacing the dangerous petrol engines used earlier. She displaced  on the surface and  submerged. The D-class submarines had a crew of 25 officers and ratings and were the first to adopt saddle tanks.

For surface running, the boats were powered by two  diesels, each driving one propeller shaft. When submerged each propeller was driven by a  electric motor. They could reach  on the surface and  underwater.

The boats were armed with three 18-inch (45 cm) torpedo tubes, two in the bow and one in the stern. They carried one reload for each tube, a total of six torpedoes.

Construction and career
D2 was laid down by Vickers on 10 July 1909 at their Barrow shipyard and commissioned on 29 March 1911. On 28 August 1914, D2, D3 and  fought in the Battle of Heligoland Bight. Then, two days before D2 met her fate, Lieutenant Commander Jameson was washed overboard off Harwich. Lt. Cdr. Head was his replacement. D2 was rammed and sunk by a German patrol boat off Borkum on 25 November 1914, leaving no survivors.

Coplestone Memorial Window, Chester

The Coplestone Memorial Window in Chester Cathedral is in memory of "F. Lewis Coplestone,  Lt-Commander, Royal Navy, HM Submarine D2" and Commander A.F. Coplesone-Boughey, RN, HMS Defence. It depicts St Anselm, Archbishop of Canterbury and shows at the bottom three coats of arms of the Coplestone family, which originated at the manor of Copleston in Devon.

Notes

References

External links
 MaritimeQuest HMS D-2 Pages
 HMS D-2 Roll of Honour
 'Submarine losses 1904 to present day' - Royal Navy Submarine Museum 

 

British D-class submarines
Royal Navy ship names
Ships built in Barrow-in-Furness
World War I shipwrecks in the North Sea
Lost submarines of the United Kingdom
Maritime incidents in November 1914
1910 ships
Warships lost in combat with all hands